Fishguard Sports are a Welsh football club from Fishguard, Pembrokeshire in the southwest of Wales. They currently play in the Pembrokeshire League Division One. They are one of the league's most successful clubs, having since their foundation in 1947, won the Division One championship eleven times.

History

Honours

 Pembrokeshire League Division One  - Champions (11): 1961–62; 1965–66; 1966–67; 1969–70; 1971–72; 1972–73; 1973–74; 1974–75; 1975–76; 1986–87; 1989–90
 Pembrokeshire League Division One  - Runners-Up (6): 1958–59; 1964–65; 1967–68; 1970–71; 1976–77; 1990–91
 Pembrokeshire League Division Two  - Champions (3): 1950–51; 1968–69 (second team); 2018–19
 Pembrokeshire League Division Two  - Runners-Up (5): 1969–70 (second team); 1970–71 (second team); 1975–76 (second team); 1977–78 (second team); 1996–97
 Pembrokeshire League Division Two North  - Champions (1): 1956–57 (second team)
 Pembrokeshire League Division Two North  - Runners Up (1): 1962–63 (second team)
 Pembrokeshire League Division Three – Champions (1): 2012–13
 Pembrokeshire League Division Three  - Runners-Up (2): 1987–88 (second team)
 Pembrokeshire League Division Four – Runners-Up (2): 2011–12; 2017–18 (second team)
 Pembrokeshire Senior Cup – Winners (8): 1964–65; 1965–66; 1966–67; 1967–68; 1971–72; 1972–73; 1974–75; 1988-89
 Pembrokeshire Senior Cup – Runners-Up (4): 1952–53; 1955–56; 1962–63; 1973-74 
 West Wales Intermediate Challenge Cup – Winners: 1973–74
 West Wales Intermediate Challenge Cup – Runners-Up (3): 1959–60; 1985–86; 1987–88

References

External links
Official club Facebook
Official club Twitter

Football clubs in Wales
Sport in Pembrokeshire
Pembrokeshire League clubs
Fishguard
Association football clubs established in 1947
1947 establishments in Wales